Cornesia arabuco is a species of moth of the family Tortricidae. It was described by Józef Razowski in 2012 and is endemic to Kenya.

The ground colour of the forewings is white-cream, sprinkled and suffused with pale grey-brown. The suffusions are browner. There are some refractive pearly scales and the markings are brownish with black dots and marks. The hindwings are brownish.

Etymology
The species name refers to the type locality.

References

External links

Moths described in 2012
Tortricini
Endemic moths of Kenya
Moths of Africa
Taxa named by Józef Razowski